Territorial Assembly elections were held in French Ivory Coast on 31 March 1957. The result was a victory for the Democratic Party of Ivory Coast – African Democratic Rally (PCDI–RDA), which won 58 of the 60 seats. The other two seats were won by PCDI–RDA dissidents.

Results

References

Ivory
Territorial Assembly election
Elections in Ivory Coast
Ivorian Territorial Assembly election
1957, Ivory Coast